This article deals with the practice of Judaism and the living arrangement of Jews in the listed countries.

See also

 Who is a Jew?
 Jewish ethnic divisions
 History of the Jews under Muslim rule
 Jewish population by country
 Historical Jewish population comparisons
 Lists of Jews
 Crypto-Judaism

References
References and sources are given within the articles themselves.